Jundallah (meaning Soldiers of Allah) may refer to:

 Army of angels in Islamic tradition
 Jundallah (Iran), a militant organization based in Balochistan, claiming to fight for the rights of Sunni Muslims in Iran.
 Jundallah (Pakistan), a banned Islamist group in Pakistan, closely tied to Al Qaeda and the Taliban